Linnea Johansson (born 25 August 1993) is a Swedish professional golfer and member of the LPGA Tour.

Amateur career
Johansson was born in Växjö and grew up in Älmhult. She started playing golf at age 10 at Grönhögen Golf Links, Öland. She attended Rikdsidrottsgymnasiet in Ljungbyhed between 2009 and 2012, and represents Båstad Golf Club.

Johansson became a member of the Swedish National Team in 2010. She represented Sweden at the European Ladies' Team Championship four times, and won the bronze at the 2017 event in Portugal together with Linnea Ström, Michaela Finn, Elin Esborn, My Leander and Filippa Möörk, her last tournament as an amateur. Johansson was the individual winner at the initial stroke-play competition.
 
Johansson played college golf in the United States between 2012 and 2017. She competed with the Nova Southeastern Sharks women's golf team as a freshman and earned Division II Women's Golf Coaches Association (WGCA) First Team All-American honors, and was 2013 Sunshine State Conference Player of the Year. She transferred to Oklahoma State University and joined the Oklahoma State Cowgirls golf team at as a redshirt freshman in the fall of 2013. In 2016, she posted the second-lowest stroke average (72.74) in program history and led all Division I competitors with 132 birdies. She was a three-time All-Big 12 performer in 2015, 2016 and 2017, joining a group of only eight Cowgirls to earn at least three All-Big 12 selections, including Maria Bodén, Caroline Hedwall, Pernilla Lindberg, Karin Sjödin and Linda Wessberg.

Professional career
Johansson graduated in 2017 and started playing on the Symetra Tour. She made steady progress over the first few seasons and on the 2019 she made the cut in 18 out of 20 events, and finished 18th on the money list. She finished T26 at the LPGA Q-Series to earn status for the 2020 LPGA Tour season, after missing the cut by one stroke the previous year.

In 2020, she was runner-up in the Mission Inn Resort and Club Championship behind Matilda Castren, and in 2021 she was runner-up at the Prasco Charity Championship in Ohio, two strokes behind Meghan MacLaren.

Johansson earned her card for the 2022 LPGA Tour through qualifying school. In 2022, she made the cut in 11 of 20 starts and finished 120th on the Official Points List and went back to LPGA Q-Series, where she finished 8th to keep her card.

Amateur wins
2008 Norberg Open, Ljunghusen Open
2009 Gräppås Junior Open, Skandia Tour Riks #4 - Göteborg
2013 Peggy Kirk Bell Invitational

Sources:

Team appearances
Amateur
European Ladies' Team Championship (representing Sweden): 2013, 2014, 2015, 2016, 2017
The Spirit International Amateur Golf Championship (representing Sweden): 2013, 2015

Source:

References

External links

Linnea Johansson at the NSU Sharks official site

Swedish female golfers
LPGA Tour golfers
Oklahoma State Cowgirls golfers
Nova Southeastern Sharks women's golfers
Sportspeople from Skåne County
People from Älmhult Municipality
People from Båstad Municipality
1993 births
Living people
21st-century Swedish women